Smile, Darn Ya, Smile! is a 1931 Warner Bros. Merrie Melodies cartoon short directed by Rudolf Ising. The short was released on September 5, 1931, and features Foxy, an early Merrie Melodies star.

This is one of only three Merrie Melodies cartoons to star Foxy; the other two are Lady, Play Your Mandolin! (August 1931) and One More Time (October 3, 1931). This short is a remake of Trolley Troubles, a Disney short featuring Oswald the Lucky Rabbit in whose creation Harman had once been involved.

For the first time in a Warner Bros. cartoon, the short uses a gag suggested by Bob Clampett that has characters from the trolley's advertising posters come to life and perform a bit of business. This type of gag would become a recurring element across Merrie Melodies.

Synopsis
Foxy is a trolley engineer whose problems include a fat lady hippo who can't fit into the trolley and a set of wheels that detach from the trolley car when Foxy gets the trolley moving. Foxy picks up Roxy and gives her a ride, but along the way, the car is blocked by a cow wearing a dress and glasses, who won't get off the track. A group of nearby hobos sing the title song while Foxy tries to move the cow; he finally runs the car underneath the cow and goes on his way.

The trolley then goes down a hill and runs out of control; Foxy tries to stop it, but the brakes don't work. Finally, the trolley runs off of a cliff, throwing Foxy right into the camera... and then he falls from bed, waking up from what has turned out to be just a nightmare. The radio by his bed is playing the title song, and the annoyed Foxy smashes the radio with a bedpost upon hearing it.

The song
In 1931, English bandleader Billy Cotton covered the song.

It was used in the finale of Robert Zemeckis' 1988 film Who Framed Roger Rabbit, segueing into Porky Pig's famous "Th-th-th-that's all, folks!".

In 2013, actor Christoph Waltz sang "Smile, Damn You, Smile" during his hosting duties on Saturday Night Live.

Colorization
In 1992, a colorized version was commissioned by Ted Turner. Due to the technological limitations of the time, the colorization process was done by tracing the original animation and then coloring it in. The colorization was completed in South Korea.

Home media
 DVD - Looney Tunes Golden Collection: Volume 6
 DVD - Return of the 30s Characters

Streaming
 HBO Max

References

External links

 
 Smile, Darn Ya, Smile! at the Big Cartoon DataBase
 

1931 films
1931 animated films
Merrie Melodies short films
American black-and-white films
Remakes of American films
Films about dreams
Films scored by Frank Marsales
Animated films about foxes
Films directed by Rudolf Ising
Foxy (Merrie Melodies) films
Rail transport films
Short film remakes
1931 songs
1930s Warner Bros. animated short films
1930s English-language films